Gardner Colby (1810–1879) was a prominent businessman and Christian philanthropist. He is the namesake of Colby College in Maine.

Early life
Colby was born in Bowdoinham, Maine in 1810 and spent part of his childhood in Waterville, Maine. His father, Josiah Colby, died in 1814 after having lost his fortune during the War of 1812, and Josiah Colby had spent time manufacturing gunpowder in Waterville before his death. To aid Colby's mother, Jeremiah Chaplin, a Baptist minister who served as the first President of Waterville College (later Colby College) arranged for the Colby family to operate a store in Charlestown, Massachusetts.

Career
Gardner Colby eventually started his own store in Boston and became involved in various other businesses including railroads, shipping and manufacturing. As a lifelong Baptist, Colby was very involved in various Christian causes. During the Civil War in 1864 the college in Waterville was facing hardships, so Colby made the first of several large donations to the college and it was subsequently renamed "Colby University" in his honor. He served as a trustee from 1864 to his death and many of his descendants became involved with the school. Colby also served as treasurer and made several large donations to what is now Andover Newton Theological School, which was a Reformed seminary located near Colby's home in Newton, Massachusetts.

Places named after Colby
Colby Hall (Newton, Massachusetts)
Colby Chapel at Andover Newton
Colby College

References

Further reading

1810 births
1879 deaths
Philanthropists from Massachusetts
Colby College
University and college founders
People from Waterville, Maine
American Civil War industrialists
Baptists from Maine
History of Wisconsin
People from Bowdoinham, Maine
Philanthropists from Maine
Baptists from Massachusetts
19th-century Baptists
19th-century American philanthropists